George Chapla is a retired  American soccer defender who played one season each in the North American Soccer League and the American Soccer League.

Ethnically Ukrainian, Chapla graduated from Union High School in 1968.  He attended Montclair State University, playing on the men's soccer team from 1968 to 1971.  In 1974, Chapla turned professional with the Rhode Island Oceaneers.  He spent the 1975 season with the Hartford Bicentennials of the North American Soccer League.  On August 28, 1975, he scored a goal for the U.S. Olympic soccer team in a 4-2 loss to Mexico in a 1976 Summer Olympics qualification game.  The U.S. failed to qualify for the tournament.  He also played on the 1975 U.S. Pan American Games soccer team.

He coached the Union High School freshmen soccer team in the mid-2000s.

References

External links
NASL career stats

American soccer players
Soccer players from New Jersey
American Soccer League (1933–1983) players
North American Soccer League (1968–1984) players
Rhode Island Oceaneers players
Connecticut Bicentennials players
Living people
American people of Ukrainian descent
Footballers at the 1975 Pan American Games
Pan American Games competitors for the United States
Association football defenders
Year of birth missing (living people)